Jack Parsons (1914–1952) was an American rocket engineer and occultist.

Jack Parsons may also refer to:

Jack Parsons (cricketer) (1890–1981), English first class cricketer for Warwickshire County Cricket Club
Jack Parsons (producer) (1906–1971), British film producer
Jack Parsons (sociologist) (1920–2006), British sociologist, advocate of population control

See also 
John Parsons (disambiguation)